Pronethalol (also known as nethalide or compound 38,174; trade name Alderlin) was an early non-selective beta blocker clinical candidate. It was the first beta blocker to be developed by James Black and associates at Imperial Chemical Industries, and the first to enter clinical use, in November 1963.

However, it was never used widely due to carcinogenicity in mice, which was thought to result from formation of a carcinogenic naphthalene epoxide metabolite, and was superseded by propranolol from 1965 onward.

See also 
 Beta blocker
 Discovery and development of beta-blockers

References 

Beta blockers
2-Naphthyl compounds
Phenylethanolamines